George Willoughby Maynard (March 5, 1843, – April 5, 1923) was an American painter, illustrator and muralist.

Biography
George W. Maynard was born in Washington, D.C. He studied at the National Academy of Design in New York City, and the Royal Academy in Antwerp, Belgium.

His best-known works are the murals inside the old Metropolitan Opera House, New York (demolished 1967); the frieze in the Appellate Court House, New York; and his mural panels at the Library of Congress.
 
He was elected an associate of the National Academy of Design in 1885, and served as its librarian.

He died in New York on April 5, 1923.

Paintings
 '76 (Soldier of the Revolution) (1876). Exhibited at the 1876 Centennial Exposition. Cover: Harper's Weekly, July 15, 1876. 
  Portrait of Francis Davis Millet, Dressed as a War Correspondent (1878), National Portrait Gallery, Smithsonian. 1884 Temple Gold Medal: Pennsylvania Academy of the Fine Arts.
 Sappho (1888), Pennsylvania Academy of the Fine Arts. 
 In Strange Seas (1889), Metropolitan Museum of Art.

Murals

 Moses and King David, St. John's Church, Jamaica Plain, Boston, Massachusetts
 Library of Congress
 Adventure
 Discovery
 Conquest
 Civilization
 Justice
 Courage
 Fortitude
 Patriotism
 Ceiling disc mural: Courage - Valor - Fortitude - Achievement

Gallery

References

External links

 Photograph of George W. Maynard from the Library of Congress

1843 births
1923 deaths
American muralists
19th-century American painters
American male painters
20th-century American painters
Realist painters
National Academy of Design members
Royal Academy of Fine Arts (Antwerp) alumni
19th-century American male artists
20th-century American male artists